Association Sportive Hilmi-Sport was a football club based in Beirut, Lebanon. Established in 1936, they won two Lebanese FA Cups in 1939 and 1940, and were finalists in the inaugural Lebanese FA Cup in 1938.

History 
Hilmi-Sport was founded in 1936 by Khalil Hilmi, with Imre Zinger from Hungary appointed as the first coach. The club was known as "the Red Devils", and wore a red shirt with black shorts. Hilmi-Sport hosted several foreign teams, most notably Austrian clubs First Vienna and Admira Vienna, and Romanian club CFR Cluj, among others.

In 1937–38 Hilmi-Sport won the Lebanese Second Division, and were runners up in the Lebanese FA Cup. They won the FA Cup twice in a row: in 1938–39 and 1939–40. Two players from Hilmi-Sport took part in Lebanon's first official international match in 1940, against Mandatory Palestine: Muhieddine Jaroudi and club captain Salah Falah.

Honours
Lebanese FA Cup
Winners (2): 1938–39, 1939–40
Runners-up (1): 1937–38
Lebanese Second Division
Winners (1): 1937–38

References

Bibliography 
 

 
Defunct football clubs in Lebanon
Football clubs in Lebanon
Association football clubs established in 1936
1930s establishments in Lebanon